Kristian Skrede Gleditsch (born 9 October 1971 in Oslo, Norway) is a Norwegian political scientist and a professor at the University of Essex, holding the title of Regius Professor. His main fields of research are on the topics of conflict, democratistation and non-violent mobilisation.

Education and Career
Gleditsch holds a cand.mag. degree from the University of Oslo (1993), and a PhD in political science from the University of Colorado (1999). He was a researcher at the University of Glasgow and the University of California San Diego before moving on to Essex in 2005. Since 2003 he has also held a minor position at the Peace Research Institute Oslo (PRIO) and in 2007-2011 he received a major "Young Excellent Researcher" grant from the Research Council of Norway. In 2013, he received a Starting Grant from the European Research Council.

Gleditsch is one of the editors of Research and Politics (2015- ) and has previously been co-editor of the British Journal of Political Science (2010-2013). He is member of the editorial boards of several other academic journals.

He is a member of the board of the American Political Science Association (2016-2019) and has headed the Conflict Processes Section (2014-2016). He has held a number of positions in the International Studies Association, of which he was Vice President 2013–2014.

Awards
He has received several prizes and distinctions for his scientific work, including the Helen Dwight Reid Award from the American Political Science Association for the best thesis in international politics completed in 1998{{ }}, and the Karl Deutsch award for young researchers within international politics and peace research, awarded by the International Studies Association in 2007{{}}.

In 2017, Gleditsch was appointed as a Regius Professor at the University of Essex, the only such appointment for a professor of political science.

Personal life
Kristian Skrede Gleditsch is the son of Kari Skrede and Nils Petter Gleditsch, and is married to Theodora-Ismene Gizelis.

Selected bibliography
 Kristian Skrede Gleditsch: All International Politics Is Local. The Diffusion of Conflict, Integration, and Democratization. Ann Arbor, MI: University of Michigan Press (2002).
 Ward, Michael D. & Kristian Skrede Gleditsch. Spatial Regression Models. In the series Quantitative Applications in the Social Sciences. Thousand Oaks, CA: Sage (2008).
 Cederman, Lars-Erik; Kristian Skrede Gleditsch, & Halvard Buhaug. Inequality, Grievances, and Civil War. Cambridge: Cambridge University Press (2013).

References

External links
 Staff page University of Essex
 Staff page at PRIO
 Researcher ID Profile

Living people
1971 births
Peace and conflict scholars
Norwegian political scientists
University of Oslo alumni
University of Colorado alumni
Academics of the University of Essex